Proton FC was a team in the Malaysian Premier League football competition, sponsored by Malaysian national carmaker Proton. The team was based in Shah Alam, Selangor, Malaysia. They played in the second level in Malaysian football, the Malaysia Premier League. Their home stadium was the MBPJ Stadium, Petaling Jaya, Selangor, Malaysia. The currently competing in Selangor League.

Honours

Achievements

Staff and Coach
 Team Manager: Razak Majid
 Assistant manager: Azhar Noordin
 Head coach: Paolo Tirinnanzi
 Assistant coach: Kamarulzaman Talib
 Goalkeeper coach: 
 Physio         : 
 Fitness coach  :

Current squad

Managers

Coaches

Former notable player-coach

  Paolo Tirinnanzi

External links
 Malaysia Soccer 
 Proton (carmaker) 

Football clubs in Malaysia
1986 establishments in Malaysia